Bouchercon is an annual convention of creators and devotees of mystery and detective fiction. It is named in honour of writer, reviewer, and editor Anthony Boucher; also the inspiration for the Anthony Awards, which have been issued at the convention since 1986. This page details Bouchercon XXXVII and the 21st Anthony Awards ceremony.

Bouchercon
The convention was held in Madison, Wisconsin on September 28, 2006; running until October 1. The event was chaired by Al Abramson.

Special Guests
Lifetime Achievement award — Robert B. Parker
Guest of Honor — M. C. Beaton
American Guest of Honor — Nevada Barr
Fan Guest of Honor — Jim Huang
Toastmaster — William Kent Krueger
Special Guest — Joseph Wambaugh

Anthony Awards
The following list details the awards distributed at the twenty-first annual Anthony Awards ceremony.

Novel award
Winner:
William Kent Krueger, Mercy Falls

Shortlist:
Jan Burke, Bloodlines
Michael Connelly, The Lincoln Lawyer
Thomas H. Cook, Red Leaves
Laura Lippman, To the Power of Three

First novel award
Winner:
Chris Grabenstein, Tilt-a-Whirl

Shortlist:
Megan Abbott, Die a Little
Brian Freeman, Immoral
Randall Hicks, The Baby Game
Theresa Schwegel, Office Down

Paperback original award
Winner:
Reed Farrel Coleman, The James Deans

Shortlist:
Allan Guthrie, Kiss Her Goodbye
Charlie Huston, Six Bad Things
Susan McBride, Good Girl's Guide to Murder
P. J. Parrish, A Killing Rain

Short story award
Winner:
Barbara Seranella, "Misdirection", from Greatest Hits: Original Stories of Assassins, Hit Men and Hired Guns

Shortlist:
Libby Fischer Hellmann, "House Rules", from Murder in Vegas: New Crime Tales of Gambling and Desperation
Nancy Pickard, "There is No Crime on Easter Island", from Ellery Queen's Mystery Magazine September / October 2005
Marcia Talley, "Driven to Distraction", from Chesapeake Crimes II: 15 Tales of Mystery, Mayhem, and Murder
Elaine Viets, "Killer Blonde: A Dead-End Job Mystery", from Drop-Dead Blonde

Critical / Non-fiction award
Winner:
Marvin Lachman, The Heirs of Anthony Boucher

Shortlist:
Hallie Ephron, Writing and Selling your Mystery Novel
Stuart Kaminsky, Behind the Mystery
Leslie Klinger, New Annotated Sherlock Holmes
Melanie Rehak, Girl Sleuth: Nancy Drew and the Women who Created Her

Fan publication award
Winner:
Jon Jordan & Ruth Jordan, Crimespree Magazine

Shortlist:
George Easter, Deadly Pleasures
Lynn Kaczmarek & Chris Aldrich, Mystery News
Janet Rudolph, Mystery Readers Journal
Brian Skupin & Kate Stine, Mystery Scene Magazine

Special service award
Winner:
Janet Rudolph, Mystery Readers International

Shortlist:
George Easter, Deadly Pleasures
Maddy Van Hertbruggen, 4 Mystery Addicts
Sarah Weinman, Confessions of an Idiosyncratic Mind

References

Anthony Awards
37
2006 in Wisconsin